Popovići Žumberački is an uninhabited settlement in Žumberak, on the border of Croatia and Slovenia.

References

Ghost towns in Croatia